The City of London Solicitors' Company is one of the 110 livery companies of the City of London. The company was formed in 1908; the City granted it Livery status in 1944. The company received a royal charter in 1958. Prior to 1969, when the City of London Law Society was formed, the company functioned as a law society for the city's solicitors. Today, the company mainly functions as a charitable body. The company is not to be confused with the London Solicitors UK legal firm.

The Company ranks seventy-ninth in the order of precedence for livery companies. Its motto is Lex Libertatis Origo, Latin for Law is the Source of Liberty.

The company is a member of the Financial Services Group of livery companies, the other 11 members of which are the Worshipful Companies of Chartered Accountants, Actuaries, Arbitrators, International Bankers, Chartered Secretaries and Administrators, Insurers, Information Technologists, Management Consultants, Marketors, Tax Advisers, and World Traders.

References

External links
 The Solicitors' Company

Solicitors
Solicitors
1908 establishments in England